is a 1952 Japanese drama film directed and co-written (with Shinobu Hashimoto and Hideo Oguni) by Akira Kurosawa. The film examines the struggles of a terminally ill Tokyo bureaucrat (played by Takashi Shimura) and his final quest for meaning. The screenplay was partly inspired by Leo Tolstoy's 1886 novella The Death of Ivan Ilyich.

The major themes of the film include learning how to live, the inefficiency of bureaucracy, and decaying family life in Japan, which have been the subject of analysis by academics and critics. Ikiru has received widespread critical acclaim, and won awards for Best Film at the Kinema Junpo and Mainichi Film Awards. It was remade as a television film in 2007, and adapted into English as Living in 2022.

Plot
Kanji Watanabe has worked in the same monotonous bureaucratic position for thirty years and is near his retirement. His wife is dead and his son and daughter-in-law, who live with him, seem to care mainly about Watanabe's pension and their future inheritance. At work, he's a party to constant bureaucratic inaction. In one case, a group of parents are seemingly endlessly referred to one department after another when they want a cesspool cleared out and replaced by a playground. After learning he has stomach cancer and less than a year to live, Watanabe attempts to come to terms with his impending death. He plans to tell his son about the cancer, but decides against it when his son does not pay attention to him. He then tries to find escape in the pleasures of Tokyo's nightlife, guided by an eccentric novelist whom he has just met. In a nightclub, Watanabe requests a song from the piano player, and sings "Gondola no Uta" with great sadness. His singing greatly affects those watching him. After one night submerged in the nightlife, he realizes this is not the solution.

The following day, Watanabe encounters a young female subordinate, Toyo, who needs his signature on her resignation. He takes comfort in observing her joyous love of life and enthusiasm and tries to spend as much time as possible with her. She eventually becomes suspicious of his intentions and grows weary of him. After convincing her to join him for the last time, he opens up and asks for the secret to her love of life. She says that she does not know, but that she found happiness in her new job making toys, which makes her feel like she is playing with all the children of Japan. Inspired by her, Watanabe realizes that it is not too late for him to do something significant. Like Toyo, he wants to make something, but is unsure what he can do within the city bureaucracy until he remembers the lobbying for a playground. He surprises everyone by returning to work after a long absence, and begins pushing for a playground despite concerns he is intruding on the jurisdiction of other departments.

Watanabe dies, and at his wake, his former co-workers gather, after the opening of the playground, and try to figure out what caused such a dramatic change in his behavior. His transformation from listless bureaucrat to passionate advocate puzzles them. As the co-workers drink, they slowly realize that Watanabe must have known he was dying, even when his son denies this, as he was unaware of his father's condition. They also hear from a witness that in the last few moments in Watanabe's life, he sat on the swing at the park he built. As the snow fell, he sang "Gondola no Uta". The bureaucrats vow to live their lives with the same dedication and passion as he did. But back at work, they lack the courage of their newfound conviction.

Cast

 Takashi Shimura as Kanji Watanabe
 Shinichi Himori as Kimura
 Haruo Tanaka as Sakai
 Minoru Chiaki as Noguchi
 Bokuzen Hidari as Ohara
 Miki Odagiri as Toyo Odagiri, employee
 Kamatari Fujiwara as Sub-Section Chief Ōno
 Nobuo Nakamura as Deputy Mayor
 Yūnosuke Itō as Novelist
 Minosuke Yamada as Subordinate Clerk Saito
 Makoto Kobori as Kiichi Watanabe, Kanji's Brother
 Nobuo Kaneko as Mitsuo Watanabe, Kanji's son
 Atsushi Watanabe as Patient
 Noriko Honma as Housewife

Themes

Living
Death is a major theme in the film, which leads to the protagonist Watanabe's quest to find the meaning of life. Initially, Watanabe looks to nightclubs and women to live life to the fullest, but winds up singing the 1915 song "Gondola no Uta" as an expression of loss. Professor Alexander Sesonske writes that in the nightclub scene, Watanabe realizes "pleasure is not life," and that a goal gives him new happiness, with the song "Happy Birthday to You" symbolizing his rebirth. Because Toyo is young, she has the best insight as to how to live, and is presented as the "unlikely savior" in Watanabe's "redemption."

Author Donald Richie wrote that the title of the film, meaning simply "to live," could signify that "existence is enough." However, Watanabe finds existence is painful, and takes this as inspiration, wanting to ensure his life has not been futile. The justification of his life, found in his park, is how Watanabe discovered how "to live." In the end, Watanabe now sings "Gondola no Uta" with great contentment.

Bureaucracy
Ikiru is also an "indictment of Japanese bureaucracy." In Japan after World War II, it was expected that the sararīman (salary man) would work predictably in accordance with an organization's rules. The scene where the mothers first visit the city office requesting a playground shows "unconcern" in the bureaucrats, who send the visitors on a "farcical runaround," before asking them for a written request, with paperwork in the film symbolizing "meaningless activity." Despite this, Watanabe uses the bureaucracy to forge his legacy, and is apparently not disturbed when the bureaucracy quickly forgets he drove the project to build the playground.

Japanese health care is also depicted as overly bureaucratic in the film, as Watanabe visits a clinic in a "poignant" scene. The doctor is portrayed as paternalistic, and Watanabe does not stand up to his authority.

Family life
Author Timothy Iles writes that, as with Yasujirō Ozu's 1953 film Tokyo Story, Ikiru may hold a negative view about the state of family life in modern Japan. Watanabe has lived with his son for years, but they have fallen out of any true relationship. His son, Mitsuo, sees Watanabe as a bother, and regards him as only an obstacle to his obtaining the money from Watanabe's will. The children fall short of their responsibility to respect their parents.

Urbanization may be a reason for negative changes in Japanese society, although a reason for Watanabe and Mitsuo's drift is also Watanabe's preoccupation with work. Another reason is Watanabe not being with Mitsuo during a medical treatment when the boy was 10, which fits a pattern in Kurosawa's films of sons being overly harsh to their fathers.

Production

The film marked the first collaboration between director Akira Kurosawa and screenwriter Hideo Oguni. According to Oguni, the genesis of the film was Kurosawa's desire to make a film about a man who knows he is going to die, and wants a reason to live for a short time. Oguni was an experienced writer and was offered ¥500,000, while co-writer Shinobu Hashimoto was offered ¥150,000. Initially, Kurosawa told Hashimoto that a man who was set to die in 75 days had to be the theme, and that the character's career was less important, with the director saying criminal, homeless man or government minister would be acceptable.

The screenwriters consulted Leo Tolstoy's novella The Death of Ivan Ilyich, and Oguni envisioned placing Watanabe's death halfway through the film. Kurosawa dictated the scene where Watanabe is on the swing, and mentioned the beginning lyrics of "Gondola no Uta." Since none of the men were familiar with the song, they consulted their eldest receptionist on the rest of the lyrics and the song title.

Kurosawa renamed the draft The Life of Kanji Watanabe to Ikiru, which Hashimoto found pretentious, but Oguni supported. The screenplay was completed on 5 February 1952.

Release
In Japan, Toho released the film on 9 October 1952. The film was also screened in the 1954 Berlin International Film Festival.

In the United States, the film was shown for a short time in California in 1956, under the title Doomed. It opened as Ikiru in New York City on 29 January 1960. The film poster featured the stripper seen briefly in the film, rather than Watanabe.

Reception

Critical reception

The film won critical approval upon its release. Bosley Crowther, writing for The New York Times, called it "a strangely fascinating and affecting film, up to a point—that being the point where it consigns its aged hero to the great beyond," which he deemed "anticlimactic." Crowther praised Shimura, saying he "measures up through his performance in this picture with the top film actors anywhere," and complimented Miki Odagiri, Nobuo Kaneko and Yunosuke Ito. Variety staff called the film "a tour-de-force," by "keeping a dramatic thread throughout and avoiding the mawkish."

Roger Ebert added it to his list of Great Movies in 1996, saying, "Over the years I have seen Ikiru every five years or so, and each time it has moved me, and made me think. And the older I get, the less Watanabe seems like a pathetic old man, and the more he seems like every one of us." In his Great Movies review of Seven Samurai, Ebert called it Kurosawa's greatest film. In 2008, Wally Hammond of Time Out praised Ikiru as "one of the triumphs of humanist cinema." That year, The New Yorker'''s Michael Sragow described it as a "masterwork," noting Kurosawa was usually associated more with his action films. The scene featuring Watanabe on the swing in the playground he built has been described as "iconic." Writer Pico Iyer has commented on the film's depiction of the postwar Japanese healthcare system, and historian David Conrad has remarked on its portrayal of Japanese governance at the moment Japan regained its sovereignty after a 7-year American occupation.

In 1972 Sight & Sound critics poll named Ikiru the 12th greatest film of all time. The Village Voice ranked the film at number 212 in its Top 250 "Best Films of the Century" list in 1999, based on a poll of critics. Empire magazine ranked Ikiru 459th on its 2008 list of the 500 greatest movies of all time, and 44th on its 2010 list of "The 100 Best Films Of World Cinema." In 2009 the film was voted at No. 13 on the list of The Greatest Japanese Films of All Time by Japanese film magazine Kinema Junpo. In 2010 Ikiru was included on Times All-Time 100 best movies list. In 2012 the film ranked 127th and 132nd on critic's and director's poll respectively in Sight & Sound Top 250 Films list. Martin Scorsese included it on a list of "39 Essential Foreign Films for a Young Filmmaker." The film was included in BBC's 2018 list of The 100 greatest foreign language films. Conversely, in 2016 The Daily Telegraph named it one of the 10 most overrated films. The film has a 98% positive rating on Rotten Tomatoes based on 44 reviews, with a weighted average of 8.76/10. The site's consensus reads: "Ikiru is a well-acted and deeply moving humanist tale about a man facing his own mortality, one of legendary director Akira Kurosawa's most intimate films".

Accolades
The film competed for the Golden Bear at the 4th Berlin International Film Festival in 1954.

Legacy
Kurosawa believed William Shakespeare's play Macbeth could serve as a cautionary tale complementing Ikiru, thus directing his 1957 film Throne of Blood. Ikiru was remade as a Japanese television film that debuted on TV Asahi on 9 September 2007, the day after a remake of Kurosawa's High and Low. The Ikiru remake stars kabuki actor Matsumoto Kōshirō IX.Anand, a 1971 Indian Hindi film, was loosely inspired by Ikiru. In 2003, DreamWorks attempted to make a U.S. remake, which would star Tom Hanks in the lead role, and talked to Richard Price about adapting the screenplay. Jim Sheridan agreed to direct the film in 2004, though it has not been produced.

A British remake titled Living, adapted by Kazuo Ishiguro, directed by Oliver Hermanus, and starring Bill Nighy, was released in 2022.

References

Bibliography
 
 
 
 
 
 
 
 
 
 

External links

 
 
 
 Ikiru''  at the Japanese Movie Database
 Ikiru Many Autumns Later an essay by Pico Iyer at the Criterion Collection
To the Tune of Mortality: “The Gondola Song” in Ikiru an essay by Geoffrey O’Brien

1952 drama films
1952 films
Best Film Kinema Junpo Award winners
Films about cancer
Films about death
Films about old age
Films based on short fiction
Films based on works by Leo Tolstoy
Films directed by Akira Kurosawa
Films produced by Sōjirō Motoki
Films scored by Fumio Hayasaka
Films set in Tokyo
Japanese black-and-white films
Japanese drama films
1950s Japanese-language films
Films with screenplays by Akira Kurosawa
Films with screenplays by Hideo Oguni
Films with screenplays by Shinobu Hashimoto
Social realism in film
Toho films
Films about bureaucracy
Works about meaning of life
1950s Japanese films